Michael John Watkins (born 9 January 1952 in Abercarn) is a former Welsh rugby union player who won four caps for  as a hooker. He played club rugby for Cardiff and Newport and county rugby for Monmouthshire.

Rugby career
Watkins played rugby from a young age, and represented several youth and school teams from the Newport area, including Cwmcarn Youth, Gwent Schools and South Monmouthshire Schools. After spending two seasons with Crumlin, Watkins moved to first class team Cardiff. Two years after joining Cardiff, Watkins gained his first Welsh trial in 1977. In 1978, Watkins was selected for the Welsh tour of Australia, though he was not chosen for either of the two tests. Watkins was selected for the Wales B team several times during the 1970s, but did not gain his first full cap until 1984 when he had switched club to Newport.

Watkins gained his first international cap in a match against Ireland as part of the 1984 Five Nations Championship. Watkins did not only represent his country he was also given the captaincy, making him only the fourth Welsh player to be given the captain's role on his debut. The Welsh and Watkins were victorious, beating the Irish 18-9 at Lansdowne Road. Watkins played a further three games for Wales, all as captain. His final game was against the touring Australian team in 1984 at the Cardiff Arms Park. Watkins resigned from international rugby in 1984, along with past Welsh captains, Eddie Butler and Gareth Davies. Mike currently lives in Bangkok and has released an autobiography entitled 'Spikey, 2 Hard to Handle'.

Bibliography

References

1952 births
Living people
Barbarian F.C. players
Cardiff RFC players
Crawshays RFC players
Crumlin RFC players
Newport RFC players
Monmouthshire County RFC players
Rugby union players from Abercarn
Rugby union hookers
Wales international rugby union players
Wales rugby union captains
Welsh rugby union players